Holy Diver may refer to:

Holy Diver, the debut album of heavy metal band Dio, released in 1983
"Holy Diver" (song), the first single off the album
Holy Diver (video game), a video game released in Japan in 1989